Luis Heberto Fonseca (born June 3, 1977) is a Venezuelan long-distance runner, who twice represented Venezuela in the men's marathon race at the Summer Olympics: in 2004 and 2008. He set his personal best in the men's marathon (2:11:49) on April 15, 2002 in the Boston Marathon.

Early life and education
Fonseca was born on June 3, 1977, in Los Hornos, Táchira, Venezuela.

Achievements

References
Luis Fonseca at Sports-Reference

1977 births
Athletes (track and field) at the 2003 Pan American Games
Athletes (track and field) at the 2004 Summer Olympics
Athletes (track and field) at the 2008 Summer Olympics
Living people
Olympic athletes of Venezuela
Venezuelan male long-distance runners
Venezuelan male marathon runners
Central American and Caribbean Games silver medalists for Venezuela
Competitors at the 2002 Central American and Caribbean Games
Central American and Caribbean Games medalists in athletics
Pan American Games competitors for Venezuela
People from Táchira
20th-century Venezuelan people
21st-century Venezuelan people